The 2008 Wildcats football team represented the University of Arizona in the 2008 NCAA Division I FBS football season. The team's head coach was Mike Stoops, in his fifth year at Arizona. The Wildcats played their home games at Arizona Stadium in Tucson, Arizona and compete in the Pacific-10 Conference. Arizona finished the 2008 regular season with a record of 7–5, and faced BYU in the Las Vegas Bowl on December 20, their first postseason appearance since 1998; they defeated the Cougars 31–21 for a final record of 8–5.  In that game, the Wildcats' 31 points were the most put up by the team in any of their bowl appearances.  Senior wide receiver Mike Thomas, playing in his final game as a Wildcat, also got the Pac-10 record of most receptions by any wide receiver in the Pac-10.  Senior Quarterback Willie Tuitama was named MVP for the 2008 Las Vegas Bowl, by throwing 328 yards, 2 pass TD's and 1 rush TD.

Schedule

Schedule Source: 2008 Arizona Wildcats football schedule

Game summaries

Idaho

In the 2008 season opener, Arizona would dominate in this 70–0 shutout over the visiting Vandals of Idaho. For the game, the Wildcats would outgain the Vandals in total offense 521 to 112 yards. The game also marked the most points scored in a game by Arizona since a 74-0 victory in 1921 over the Texas College of Mines and Metallurgy in addition to its first shutout since the 1996 season.

Toledo

New Mexico

UCLA

Washington

Stanford

California

USC

Washington State

Washington State scored first – taking its first lead of the season in a Pac-10 game – when Dwight Tardy took a pitch from QB Kevin Lopina and ran 18 yards with 10:10 left in the first. Arizona replied with a 12-play drive and WR Mike Thomas ran 5 yards for a touchdown to tie the game. Arizona TE Rob Gronkowski caught a short pass from QB Willie Tuitama and ran 43 yards for a touchdown to put Arizona up 14–7 at the end of the first quarter. After getting the ball on their own 46 to start the next drive, WSU's Logwone Mitz tore off runs of 8 and 42 yards to take the ball to Arizona's 4. Lopina ran it in to tie the score at 14. Arizona replied with an 81-yard drive with RB Keola Antolin running 5 yards up the middle for a 21–14 lead with 10:20 left in the half. The WSU offense stalled the rest of the half. Meanwhile, Tuitama ran in from the 4 on a broken play for a 28–14 Arizona advantage. Arizona's Devin Ross intercepted Lopina on the next series, and RB Nic Grigsby ran it three times, the last for a 6-yard touchdown and a 35–14 halftime lead. Wildcat RB Xavier Smith scored on a 6-yard run on the opening drive of the second half for a 42–14 lead. Mitz scored from 3 yards out on the next series to bring WSU to within 42–21. Arizona would go on to beat Washington State by a final score of 59–28 for win number 6, making the Wildcats eligible for their first bowl game since 1998.

Oregon

The Oregon Ducks started hot against the Arizona Wildcats in Eugene, with Jeremiah Masoli getting a career-high in rushing touchdowns (3) and broke the record for an Oregon quarterback in this category in a single Ducks game. He also had two passing touchdowns, all five in the first half. Oregon led at the half, 45–17, but Arizona started the second half hot. The Wildcats managed to hold the Ducks to merely ten points in the second half, while they had a 21-point fourth quarter to pull within three. However, a 40-yard touchdown hit from Masoli to LeGarrette Blounte sealed the Ducks win, 55–45, to avenge a loss to the Wildcats from last year. This game was the first in which the Ducks wore their new "blackout" jerseys and black helmets, to fit with the Autzen Stadium "blackout" theme for the game.

Oregon State

Before an enthusiastic crowd of 48,503 at Arizona Stadium, Oregon State had to go without starting quarterback Lyle Moevao, sidelined by a shoulder injury. Then they lost tailback Jacquizz Rodgers, the Pac-10's leading rusher and Pac-10 Player of the Year candidate, to a shoulder injury on their second possession. With the score tied at 10–10 early in the fourth quarter (on a 16-yard touchdown pass to Arizona TE Rob Gronkowski with 16 seconds left in the third quarter), Oregon State head coach Mike Riley went for it twice on fourth down near midfield. The first one worked and the second did not, and it proved costly. After backup tailback Ryan McCants lost a yard on fourth-and-1 at Arizona's 49, the Wildcats went on an eight-play march capped by a 9-yard touchdown run by RB Keola Antolin to give Arizona a 17–10 lead. Oregon State responded with a 10-play, 80-yard drive for a touchdown. Then, Beavers kicker Justin Kahut missed the extra point with 3:58 left, seemingly giving Arizona the chance for the win. Arizona's offense stalled, and while the Wildcats led 17–16 with 1:19 to play, Oregon State took over at their own 20 with no timeouts left. Oregon State quarterback Sean Canfield, who started in place of Moevao, hit Jeremy Francis for a 20-yard catch to the 40. A seven-yard run by receiver James Rodgers went to the 47. On the third play of the drive, Canfield found Sammie Stroughter alone behind the Wildcats secondary for a 47-yard gain to the Arizona 7. Then, Kahut calmly nailed a 24-yard field goal as time expired to seal an improbable 19–17 victory, redeeming himself and leaving the Beavers one win away from their first Rose Bowl trip since 1965. Keola Antolin rushed for 114 yards and a touchdown for Arizona, while Arizona QB Willie Tuitama threw for 158 yards and a score.

Arizona State

The Wildcats were not just playing for in-state bragging rights this year in their 82nd meeting for the Territorial Cup. The Las Vegas Bowl announced on December 5 that the winner of this game would be extended an invitation to appear.

A sellout crowd of 58,704 (sixth-largest in Arizona Stadium history) was on hand; they had to suffer through a first half in which both teams struggled to find a rhythm offensively. The Wildcats scored first, 7–0 with 5:44 left in the first quarter, on a 17-yard pass from QB Willie Tuitama to TE Rob Gronkowski. On the drive, the Wildcats marched 98 yards in 12 plays – their longest scoring drive of the season.

Arizona State cut the Wildcat lead to 7–3 on a 40-yard field goal by Thomas Weber.

UA punter Keenyn Crier was ruled down on his right knee while trying to retrieve a low snap in the second quarter, giving the Sun Devils possession on the Wildcat 19 and setting up an easy two-play drive from QB Rudy Carpenter as he eventually hit WR Andrew Pettes for a 2-yard pass for a go-ahead Arizona State touchdown, making the score 10–7.

The 'Cats would fight back, and scored on their first offensive possession of the second half, as Tuitama led the Wildcats on an 11-play, 70-yard scoring drive. He connected with WR Delashaun Dean on a 10-yard slant route for the score. Kicker Jason Bondzio's PAT gave the Cats a 14–10 lead.

Arizona would score again after a 47-yard Marquis Hundley interception of a Rudy Carpenter pass led to a 12-yard scoring run by UA tailback Nic Grigsby. The Wildcats scored again on a dramatic 52-yard punt return from WR Mike Thomas, to quickly transform a 10–7 halftime deficit into a 28–10 lead.

Jason Bondzio kicked a 49-yard field goal for a 31–10 lead with 12:34 to go in the game.

Grigsby finished with 114 rushing yards on 22 carries. Tuitama completed 25 of 37 passes for 284 yards and two touchdowns. TE Rob Gronkowski led the team with six catches for 95 yards. WR Mike Thomas finished with nine catches for 75 yards and was selected the game MVP.

Arizona State, with the Wildcat win, ends their relatively disappointing season at 5–7, and as such is kept from being invited to a bowl game for the first time since 2003.

Brigham Young (2008 Pioneer Las Vegas Bowl)

Willie Tuitama threw for 322 yards and two touchdowns as Arizona won its first bowl game in 10 years in front of a crowd of 40,047 at Sam Boyd Stadium in Las Vegas.

The Wildcats stifled BYU quarterback Max Hall throughout the game, forcing him to scramble often, lose a fumble and throw an interception. Arizona (8–5) kept the ball in the air most of the game. Tuitama threw a 71-yard pass to WR Terrell Turner that set up the first score, a 37-yard touchdown to WR Delashaun Dean that gave the Wildcats the lead for good in the third quarter, and a 24-yard strike to RB Chris Gronkowski that sent Cougars fans toward the exits (Tuitama would run 6 yards into the end zone to complete the drive). The Wildcats' third-quarter scoring spree salvaged an otherwise-unlucky period. Arizona thought it had recovered a fumble three plays earlier, when BYU WR Austin Collie caught a screen pass, took a step, ran into his own blocker and fumbled. UA safety Nate Ness recovered at BYU's 11. The game's referee crew opted to review the play, and ruled that Collie had never demonstrated possession. The Cougars completed a short pass on third down, then punted. Arizona's five days in Las Vegas had a little bit of everything — fun, drama and even questions about Mike Stoops' job future (Stoops was rumored to be a candidate for the vacant Iowa State head coach position which was filled by Auburn assistant coach Paul Rhoads).

Awards 
Willie Tuitama (QB)

 All-Pacific-10 (2nd team)
 Las Vegas Bowl MVP

Mike Thomas (WR/Return Specialist)

 All-Pacific-10 (1st team)

Rob Gronkowski (TE)

 All-Pacific-10 (1st team)

Eben Britton (OL)

 All-Pacific-10 (1st team)

Joe Longacre (OL)

 All-Pacific-10 (2nd team)

Devin Ross (CB)

 All-Pacific-10 (2nd team)

Jason Bondzio (K)

 All-Pacific-10 (2nd team)

References

Arizona
Arizona Wildcats football seasons
Las Vegas Bowl champion seasons
Arizona Wildcats football